Yudai may refer to:

Yudai Township, a township in Wanyuan, Sichuan, China
Jade Belt Bridge, also known as Yudai Bridge, a bridge in Summer Palace, Beijing, China
Yūdai, a masculine Japanese given name
Yudai (kickboxer), Japanese kickboxer, winner of the K-1 Japan U-18 Tournament at K-1 PREMIUM 2007 Dynamite!!